Diogo Jefferson Mendes de Melo commonly known as Diogo Melo (born 18 April 1984 in Uniao dos Palmares) is a Brazilian footballer who plays as a midfielder for S.C. Farense.

Honours
Académica de Coimbra
Taça de Portugal: 2011–12

References 

1984 births
Living people
Brazilian footballers
Association football midfielders
Cruzeiro Esporte Clube players
Marília Atlético Clube players
Portimonense S.C. players
Associação Académica de Coimbra – O.A.F. players
S.C. Olhanense players
F.C. Penafiel players
S.C. Farense players
Ermis Aradippou FC players
União Agrícola Barbarense Futebol Clube players
Primeira Liga players
Liga Portugal 2 players
Cypriot First Division players
Expatriate footballers in Cyprus
Expatriate footballers in Iran
Expatriate footballers in Portugal
Brazilian expatriate sportspeople in Portugal
Brazilian expatriate sportspeople in Cyprus
Brazilian expatriate sportspeople in Iran
Brazilian expatriate footballers